The Gossamer Albatross is a human-powered aircraft built by American aeronautical engineer Dr Paul B MacCready's company AeroVironment. On June 12, 1979, it completed a successful crossing of the English Channel to win the second Kremer prize worth £100,000.

Design and development
The aircraft was designed and built by a team led by Paul B. MacCready, a noted American aeronautics engineer, designer, and world soaring champion. Gossamer Albatross was his second human-powered aircraft, the first being the Gossamer Condor, which had won the first Kremer prize on August 23, 1977, by completing a -long figure-eight course. The second Kremer challenge was then announced as a flight across the English Channel recalling Louis Blériot's crossing of 1909.

The aircraft is of "canard" configuration, using a large horizontal stabilizer forward of the wing in a manner similar to the Wright brothers' successful Wright Flyer aircraft and powered using pedals to drive a large, two-bladed propeller. The Gossamer Albatross was constructed using a carbon fiber frame, with the ribs of the wings made with expanded polystyrene; the entire structure was then wrapped in a thin, transparent plastic (mylar PET film). The empty mass of the structure was only , although the gross mass for the Channel flight was almost . To maintain the craft in the air, it was designed with very long, tapering wings (high aspect ratio), like those of a glider, allowing the flight to be undertaken with a minimum of power.

The crossing

Just before 6 am on June 12, 1979, amateur cyclist and pilot  Bryan Allen powered the Albatross to the rehearsed speed of 75 revolutions per minute and took off from a point near Folkestone, England. The Channel conditions and lack of wind were ideal for the crossing.

However, problems soon began to affect the aircraft and pilot. Allen's radio failed for a while and he was only able to communicate with the accompanying boats by hand and head movements. In addition, Allen's water supply had been estimated for a two-hour flight, but headwinds delayed the crossing and his supply ran out. Without adequate water, Allen suffered from dehydration and leg cramps.

With increasing headwinds, concern grew that the flight would have to be called off. With the coast of France still unseen, an accompanying boat maneuvered in front of the Albatross to hook it to safety. However, for the hooking procedure, Allen had gone a little higher and found less air turbulence, so he continued to pedal the aircraft and see if progress could be made. With a calming surface wind, Allen continued, and landed on a beach at Cape Gris-Nez in France.

Versions

MacCready's team built two Albatrosses; the back-up plane was jointly tested as part of the NASA Langley/Dryden flight research program in 1980 and was also flown inside the Houston Astrodome, the first ever controlled indoor flight by a human-powered aircraft. The Gossamer Albatross II is currently on display at the Museum of Flight in Seattle, Washington.

Alistair Cooke devoted some of his Letter From America broadcast of 15/17 Jun 1979 to Allen's achievement.

Prizes
For his work on the Gossamer Albatross,  MacCready was later awarded the Collier Trophy.

Specifications

See also

Citations

Further reading

Allen, Bryan. "Winged Victory of Gossamer Albatross". National Geographic, November 1979, vol. 156, n. 5, p. 640-651
Morton Grosser. Gossamer Odyssey: The Triumph of Human-Powered Flight. MBI Press, 2004; Dover Publications, Inc., 1991; Houghton Mifflin Co., 1981
Morton Grosser. On Gossamer Wings. York Custom Graphics, 1982
Ciotti, Paul. More With Less - Paul MacCready and the dream of efficient flight. Encounter Books, 2002.

External links

NASA's page on Gossamer Albatross II
NASA image of Gossamer Albatross II
List of displayed aircraft at Udvar-Hazy center
Gossamer Albatross II at Seattle Museum of Flight
Shows various MacCready and Aerovironment aircraft, including Gossamer Penguin
Gossamer Albatross photography by the team's photographer, Don Monroe

AeroVironment aircraft
Canard aircraft
Human-powered aircraft
Single-engined pusher aircraft
1970s United States experimental aircraft
Individual aircraft in the collection of the Smithsonian Institution
Aircraft first flown in 1979